The Arrondissement of Neufchâteau is one of the five administrative arrondissements in the Walloon province of Luxembourg, Belgium. It is both an administrative and a judicial arrondissement. However, the Judicial Arrondissement of Neufchâteau also comprises the municipalities of Bastogne, Bertogne, Fauvillers, Sainte-Ode and Vaux-sur-Sûre in the Arrondissement of Bastogne.

Municipalities

The Administrative Arrondissement of Neufchâteau consists of the following municipalities:

 Bertrix
 Bouillon
 Daverdisse
 Herbeumont
 Léglise
 Libin

 Libramont-Chevigny
 Neufchâteau
 Paliseul
 Saint-Hubert
 Tellin
 Wellin

References

Neufchateau